State Highway 41 (Andhra Pradesh) is a state highway in the Indian state of Andhra Pradesh

Route 

It starts at Junction near Chintoor and passes through Rampachodavaram, Korukonda, Madhurapudi and ends at Rajahmundry.

See also 
 List of State Highways in Andhra Pradesh

References 

Transport in Rajahmundry
State Highways in Andhra Pradesh
Roads in East Godavari district